Rie is a Japanese and Dutch feminine given name. It is also an uncommon masculine short form of Henri and a surname. Notable people with the name include:

Japanese given name
Rie can be written using different kanji characters and can mean:
理恵, "logic, blessing "
利恵, "value, blessing"
梨絵, "pear, picture"
理江, "logic, inlet"
理絵, "logic, picture"
里枝, "village, branch"
梨恵, "pear, blessing"
里依, "village, reliable"
The name can also be written in hiragana or katakana. People with this name include:
Rie, a Japanese fashion model
Rie Arikawa (梨絵), a Japanese retired ice dancer
Rie Eto (利恵), a Japanese music artist
Rie Fu (リエ), a Japanese singer-songwriter
Rie Ishizuka (理恵), a Japanese voice actress
Rie Isogai (利恵), a Japanese murder victim
Rie Kitahara (北原里英), member of Japanese idol group sensation AKB48
Rie Kanda (理江), a Japanese voice actress
, Japanese women's footballer
Rie Kugimiya (理恵, born 1979) a Japanese voice actress
Rie Kaela Kimura (木村カエラりえ), Japanese singer, songwriter, model, and presenter
, Japanese long-distance runner
Rie Miyazawa (りえ), a Japanese actress and singer
, better known as Bad Nurse Nakamura, Japanese professional wrestler
Rie Oh (理恵), the second daughter of world home run king, Sadaharu Oh
, Japanese ice hockey player
, Japanese softball player
, Japanese speed skater
Rie Saito (斉藤 里恵, born 1984), Japanese politician and writer
, Japanese swimmer
Rie Suegara (里恵), Japanese voice actress
Rie Takada (りえ), a Japanese manga artist
, Japanese voice actress and singer
Rie Tanaka (理, born 1979), a Japanese singer and voice actress
Rie Terazono (理恵 寺園), a Japanese field hockey goalkeeper
Rie Tomosaka (りえ), a Japanese actress
Rie Ueno, a Japanese long-distance runner
, Japanese women's footballer
Rie Yasumi (りえ), a Japanese Senryū poet
, Japanese poet and writer

Fictional Characters
Rie Yamabishi (理恵), a character in the manga series Spriggan
Rie Aoi, a character from Chōjin Sentai Jetman

European feminine name
The Dutch name is usually a short form of Maria or Hendrika. 
Rie de Balbian Verster-Bolderhey (1890–1990), Dutch painter
Rie Beisenherz (1901–1992), Dutch swimmer
Rie Briejèr (1910–1999), Dutch sprinter and long jumper
Rie Cramer (1887–1977), Dutch writer and illustrator
Rie Mastenbroek (1919–2003), Dutch swimmer
Rie Muñoz (1921–2015), Dutch-born American artist and educator
Rie Rasmussen (born 1978), Danish fashion model, actress, film director, writer and photographer
Rie van Veen (1923–1995), Dutch swimmer
Rie Vierdag (1905–2005), Dutch swimmer

Masculine given name
Rie Meert (1920–2006), Belgian footballer (Henri)

People with the surname
An Van Rie, a Belgian racing cyclist
Lucie Rie, an Austrian-born British studio potter

See also
Rye (disambiguation)

Japanese feminine given names
Dutch feminine given names